Roadsongs may refer to:
Roadsongs (Townes van Zandt album), 1993 album
Roadsongs (The Derek Trucks Band album), 2010 live album

See also
Songs from the Road (disambiguation)